The 1914 Richmond Spiders football team was an American football team that represented Richmond College—now known as the University of Richmond—as a member of the Eastern Virginia Intercollegiate Athletic Association (EVIAA) and the South Atlantic Intercollegiate Athletic Association (SAIAA) during the 1914 college football season. Led by second-year head coach Frank Dobson, Richmond finished the season 5–4 overall, 5–1 in EVIAA play, and 0–2 against SAIAA opponents. The Spiders won the EVIAA title for the second consecutive year.

Schedule

References

Richmond
Richmond
Richmond Spiders football seasons
Richmond Spiders football